Peacockbank may refer to:

Peacockbank, County Tyrone, a townland in County Tyrone, Northern Ireland
Barony of Peacockbank, a historic barony in East Ayrshire, Scotland